Aghurubw (Pronounced A-GA-RU-B) was a Carolinian (Refaluwasch) Chief and master navigator who led his people from Satawal to what is now Saipan (a commonwealth of the United States in the western Pacific Ocean) in the early 19th century.

Journey to Saipan and settlement 

After an 1815 typhoon destroyed life on their home island of Satawal, Chief Aghurubw of the Ghatoliyool clan and Chief Nguschul (Pronounced NU-GU-SCHUL) of Elato asked permission from the Spanish Governor Farallon de Medinilla for their people to settle on Saipan. 

The Spaniards allowed them to move there to manage their cattle herds, turning the island into a ranch or cattle plantation. They were also allowed to go to Tinian, a neighboring island to Saipan. 

Aghurubw received a legal certificate and traditional symbols of a leader. He was given a cane in addition to a tall black hat. Due to the tall hat he was called parúng, the Carolinian word for hat or cap. This made him a paramount chief.
To get to the island of Saipan, which is 500 miles from Saipan, he used an ancient sea route called metawal wool. They landed on a beach called Micro Beach.  

After bringing his people there, the Carolinians built a village which he called Arabwal.  

In 1851, he used contacts offering opportunities in the northern isles to advance himself.

Legacy 
After his death in Arabwal, Chief Aghurubw buried in Managaha (Ghalaghal) island, where a statue now stands of him. He was buried upright upon his request, so he could see Micro Beach. The place is sacred to Refaluwasch people in CNMI as a result of his life, influence and burial there. People come to the island every year to celebrate him. 

Following Chief Aghurubw and Chief Nguschulthe, more Carolinians came bringing their people and establishing villages on Saipan. 

The people of Saipan celebrate 'Chief Aghurubw Day', a holiday which is an important part of the Refaluwasch culture on the CNMI. Additionally, the Ghatoliyool Clan established the Chief Aghurubw Foundation to further his legacy and impact.

References 

Northern Mariana Islands
Indigenous peoples of Micronesia
Caroline Islands
Saipan
Northern Mariana Islands people of Carolinian descent